Brand New Maid is the third studio album by Japanese all-female rock band Band-Maid. It was released on May 18, 2016, and was their first album to be released internationally. Music videos were made for "The Non-Fiction Days," "Before Yesterday," and "Alone." The album reached number 19 on the Japanese Oricon Albums Chart, selling 4,189 copies in its first week.

The international album from JPU Records includes English lyric translations, Romaji lyric transliterations, and the live bonus track "Real Existence".

Critical reception
JaME gave the album a positive review, saying "...they are serious about and capable of realizing their goal of "world domination." J-Generation noted that the album was "bigger, tougher, deeper" than the band's previous releases and that it "...proves Band-Maid’s ready to crush any protests that their cute persona disqualifies them from the "real rock" club.

Accolades
Chama and Chiaki of Gekirock listed the album as the fourth and sixth best album of 2016, respectively.

Track listing

Personnel
Band–Maid
Saiki Atsumi – lead vocals
Miku Kobato – rhythm guitar, vocals
Kanami Tōno – lead guitar
Misa – bass
Akane Hirose – drums

Charts

References

External listings
 Brand New Maid Listing at JPU Records 

Band-Maid albums
2016 albums
Nippon Crown albums
Japanese-language albums